Lovat's climbing mouse (Dendromus lovati) is a species of rodent in the family Nesomyidae.
It is found only in Ethiopia.
Its natural habitat is subtropical or tropical high-altitude grassland.
It is threatened by habitat loss.

References

Endemic fauna of Ethiopia
Dendromus
Mammals of Ethiopia
Mammals described in 1900
Taxonomy articles created by Polbot